Peg Shreve (July 23, 1927 – October 27, 2012) was an American politician who served in the Wyoming House of Representatives from the 24th district from 1979 to 1999.

She died on October 27, 2012, in Cody, Wyoming at age 85.

References

1927 births
2012 deaths
Republican Party members of the Wyoming House of Representatives